SS Russian was a British cargo ship, formerly the  Victorian, that was torpedoed and sunk by UB-43 210 miles East of Malta in the Mediterranean Sea, while she was travelling from Salonica, Greece, to Newport, United Kingdom, in ballast. She had a 1 x 3 cyl. triple expansion engine, single shaft driving a single screw propeller.

History 
Russian was constructed as a cattle and cargo carrier in 1895 for the Leyland company at the Harland & Wolff Ltd. shipyard in Belfast, United Kingdom. She was launched on 7 July 1895 and was the first of  four sister ships. She was initially named Victorian and completed her maiden voyage from Liverpool, United Kingdom, to Boston, United States.

Boer War 
As the SS Victorian, she served as a transport ship during the Boer war in November 1899. She mostly carried horses to South Africa and was used intensively on this operation.

White Star Line
In 1903 she was chartered to the White Star Line. She completed her first journey to New York City, United States, on 24 April 1903. Her name was changed to Russian in August 1914 to avoid confusion with the Allan Line's SS Victorian.

Sinking 
On 14 December 1916, Russian was on a voyage from Salonica, Greece, to Newport, United Kingdom, in ballast when she was torpedoed by UB-43 210 miles East of Malta. 28 crew members lost their lives during the sinking.

Sister ships 
SS Russian had 3 sister ships which all sank too:
  (Built 1895, torpedoed 28 June 1915 with the loss of 33 crew)
 SS Cestrian (Built 1896, torpedoed 24 June 1917 with the loss of 3 crew)
 SS Londonian (Built 1896, capsized and sank 29 November 1898 with the loss of 17 crew)
They were built for the Leyland line between 1895 and 1898.

References

Steamships of the United Kingdom
Ships built by Harland and Wolff
Maritime incidents in 1916
Ships sunk by German submarines in World War I
World War I shipwrecks in the Mediterranean Sea
1895 ships
Cargo ships of the United Kingdom
Ships of the White Star Line